Arturo Arrieta (born 12 July 1911, date of death unknown) was an Argentine footballer. He played in five matches for the Argentina national football team from 1933 to 1935. He was also part of Argentina's squad for the 1935 South American Championship.

References

External links
 

1911 births
Year of death missing
Argentine footballers
Argentina international footballers
Place of birth missing
Association football forwards
San Lorenzo de Almagro footballers
Sportivo Barracas players
Argentine football managers
All Boys managers